Camocim de São Félix is a city located in the state of Pernambuco, Brazil. Located  at 113.7 km away from Recife, capital of the state of Pernambuco. Has an estimated (IBGE 2020) population of 18,900 inhabitants.

Geography
 State - Pernambuco
 Region - Agreste Meridional Pernambucano
 Boundaries - Sairé   (N and E);  Bonito  and São Joaquim do Monte  (S);  Bezerros   (W)
 Area - 53.58 km2
 Elevation - 691 m
 Hydrography - Sirinhaém and Una rivers
 Vegetation - Subcaducifólia forest
 Clima - hot and humid
 Annual average temperature - 21.2 c
 Distance to Recife - 113.7 km

Economy
The main economic activities in Camocim de São Félix are based in agribusiness, especially tomatoes, passion fruits; and livestock such as cattle, chickens and quails.

Economic indicators

Economy by Sector
2006

Health indicators

References

Municipalities in Pernambuco